Leeds Grand Mosque (LGM) is a mosque in Leeds with a regular congregation of 1,200. It is located at 9 Woodsley Road, Hyde Park, Leeds, LS6 1SN West Yorkshire, England. The mosque has a diverse and ethnically mixed congregation with facilities for both male and female worshippers. The Friday prayer sermon is also delivered in English also alongside the Arabic.

The mosque's Imam is Sheikh Dr Mohammed Taher. The resident Islamic scholar to the mosque is Sheikh Abdullah Al Judai’.

It is the home of the first Muslim Scout Group in Leeds.  15 Scouts were invested at the launch in 2006.

Building
It was originally Sacred Heart Church designed by Derek Walker, completed in 1965 and described as "One of the most striking churches to be built in the 1960s".  The design is Brutalist based on a concrete frame clad with pre-cast panels of Cornish granite aggregate.  It closed in 1993 and was sold and converted in 1994, with funding from Saif Bin Muhammad Al-Nehayyan of Abu Dhabi, United Arab Emirates.  The chancel was converted into a smaller worship hall used on weekdays, and a women's gallery was constructed at the rear of the main hall, later augmented by converting the choir gallery into a second women's gallery.  The stained glass window and Christian symbols were removed, and facilities for wudu installed.

The main hall provides a large open space which is used as the main prayer area for men.

In 2013 a storm lifted part of the roof off, resulting in extensive rain damage.

Facilities

Male prayer hall
Female prayer hall
Lecture room
Basement – used for multiple activities
Library
Catering kitchen
Management office, storage rooms, and washing facilities for both males and females
Fenced car park for 20 cars
Gardens around the mosque
Linked house, rented as a source of income

See also
 Islam in England
 List of mosques in the United Kingdom

References

External links 
 

1994 establishments in England
Mosques completed in 1994
Mosques converted from churches in Europe
Mosques in England
Religious buildings and structures in Leeds